This is a list of Fleet Air Arm squadrons. Squadrons in bold are currently active.

700 series squadrons 
700-series squadrons are generally experimental or training squadrons, which produce trained aircrew for the operational 800-series squadrons.

800 series squadrons

The 800 Series was allocated to carrier and land based operational squadrons of the Fleet Air Arm.

1700 series squadrons

1800 series squadrons

See also

 List of Royal Air Force aircraft squadrons

References

Citations

Bibliography

External links

Fleet Air Arm